The first USS Tuna (SP-664) was a United States Navy patrol vessel in commission from 1917 to 1919.

Tuna was built as a private motor yacht of the same name by the Neilson Yacht Building Company at Baltimore, Maryland, in 1911. On 11 June 1917, the U.S. Navy acquired her under a free lease from her owner,  Edward L. Welch of Philadelphia, Pennsylvania, for use as a section patrol boat during World War I. She was commissioned as USS Tuna (SP-664) on 12 June 1917.

Assigned to the 2nd Naval District in southern New England and based at the Block Island section base in Rhode Island, Tuna patrolled the coastline between Long Island, New York, and Martha's Vineyard in Massachusetts for the rest of World War I.

Tuna was stricken from the Navy List on 11 January 1919 and returned to Welch the same day.

References

Department of the Navy Naval History and Heritage Command Online Library of Selected Images: Civilian Ships: Tuna (American Motor Boat, 1908). Served as USS Tuna (SP-664) in 1917-1919
NavSource Online: Section Patrol Craft Photo Archive Tuna (SP 664)

Patrol vessels of the United States Navy
World War I patrol vessels of the United States
Ships built in Baltimore
1911 ships
Individual yachts